Gürler (literally "he/she/it roars"; third person singular present simple of the Turkish verb gürlemek with the meaning "roar, thunder, boom, growl, rumble") is a Turkish surname and may refer to:
 Faruk Gürler (1913–1975), Turkish general
 Özge Gürler (born 1985), Turkish female sprinter   
 Serdar Gürler (born 1991), Turkish football player 
 Suna Gürler (born 1986), Swiss director, actress and drama teacher of Turkish origin
 Şenay Gürler (born 1966), Turkish actress

References

Turkish-language surnames